Claxton is a small village  south-east of Norwich, and south of the River Yare, between Rockland St. Mary and Loddon in South Norfolk, England. In the 2001 census it contained 85 households and a population of 244, the population increasing to 291 at the 2011 census. Just to the south lie the small villages of Ashby St Mary and Carleton St Peter.

The villages name origin is uncertain but possibly means 'Clacc's farm/settlement', 'Klakkr's farm/settlement' or perhaps, 'hill farm/settlement'.

 

To the east of the village are the remains of Claxton Castle, which dates from the mid-14th century, licences to crenellate having been granted in 1340 and 1376. Claxton Manor House itself was built in the reign of Elizabeth I but has a Victorian façade. The Manor was bought in 1946 by Major Derek Allhusen, who achieved fame as a horseman winning team gold and individual silver at the 1968 Summer Olympics. Derek Allhusen died in 2000.

To the south-west of the village lies Claxton Church. It is thought that the Saxon settlement which would have been built around it moved down to the marsh edge in the Middle Ages. The church has a thatched scissor-beam roof with basketweave sarking. The flint tower is unbuttressed and dates from the 14th century, though much restored.

In 1928 it was extended south to Staines Barn, just east of the church. It was used to transport sugar beet bound for the factory at Cantley which was loaded onto wherries at the river. It used  gauge jubilee track and a converted Model T Ford as motive power.

A windmill once stood at the eastern end of the village on Mill Lane. It was demolished in 1945 as it was thought to be a landmark for enemy aircraft. A Spitfire crash-landed in Claxton Marsh to the north of the village in the same year and is now on display at the Norfolk and Suffolk Aviation Museum.

Claxton no longer has a pub (closed 1974), post office (closed 1977) or school (closed 1981), although a combined shop and petrol station survived until 2002. It does have a village hall, Claxton Village Hall is shared with Carleton St Peter. The current hall was opened in 1984 and is home to a social club founded in 1987 and licensed for the sale of alcohol.

Claxton is served by bus route 85 operated by Our Bus providing three services a day into Norwich via Rockland St Mary, Bramerton and Kirby Bedon.
It also lies on National Cycle Route 1 on its route from Norwich to Beccles via Loddon.

Claxton has a Strict and Particular Baptist chapel erected in the 1750s and could hold 500 in its heyday, but finally closed for worship in 1943. Claxton Opera staged occasional performances in the Old Meeting House from 2004 to 2013.It is now a private home.

South of the village on the banks of Carleton Beck lies Ducan's Marsh, a Site of Special Scientific Interest and one of the richest areas of unimproved wet grassland in East Norfolk.

Further reading
Claxton: A Thousand Years of Village Life (2005) (Millennium Awards Fellowship)

References

http://kepn.nottingham.ac.uk/map/place/Norfolk/Claxton

External links

 Claxton Church
 Claxton Castle
 Claxton Smock mill
 Ducan's Marsh
 Claxton Opera
 https://archive.today/20120410115344/http://www.claxtonpc.norfolkparishes.gov.uk/

Villages in Norfolk
South Norfolk
Civil parishes in Norfolk